Daniel Robert Boome, (born in February 1976), is a chef, athlete and health enthusiast. He is also the host of the syndicated TV show Recipe Rehab, which is on Litton's Weekend Adventure. He grew up in Peterborough, England and began his career as a professional ice hockey player.  He became Captain of England at the age of 16 and capped over 20 times for Great Britain.

Career
Danny Boome followed an intense apprenticeship to become a top chef, beginning in Switzerland and later moving on to Canada where he worked at the West Wind Inn, before finally completing his training at the UK Cookery School, The Grange.  He then moved on to the trendy St Martins Lane Hotel in London in the Asia de Cuba restaurant.

Boome moved into the freelance chef circuit working for a diverse clientele from executive families to international event companies and even the Sultan of Oman.

He has also won the national modeling competition "The Face of Wella" and other credits include fronting an anti-drug advertising campaign for the National Police Authority, several continuity adverts for Sky TV and TV advertising for Hellman's. He presented "Wild and Fresh" in 2003, a travel cookery documentary filmed in Canada, and followed this up in 2004 by a series called Norfolk Riviera for Anglia Television and UK Food Channel.  More recently, he has teamed up with Uncle Ben's to develop three inspiring recipes using their rice and sauces, and he can be seen presenting the Uncle Ben's television and media advertising campaign.

Boome appeared in the Food Network series, "Rescue Chef," starting in March 2008.

Boome cites his hobbies as socializing, movies, art, traveling, skiing and Ice Hockey.

On February 17, 2009, Boome appeared on Live! with Regis and Kelly as the bachelor featured in their "Dating with the Stars" segment. After asking three of the bachelorettes random questions, such as "In your sexiest voice tell me your favourite fruit?" Boome chose bachelorette #3, Geraldine Bergin from Bayside, NY to go on a date with.

The year 2010 saw Boome launching a range of projects, his live stage show Dorm Storm will tour 40 different universities in the United States with a new kind of cooking game show to help promote students beating the freshman 15. Boome also has launched a New York-based cooking school which offers Rescue Clinic day courses and Essential cooking 2- and 4-week courses.

From 2011 to 2012, Boome was a correspondent on ABC's The Chew.

Danny Boome also appeared alongside Nikki Martin, a finalist on the eighth season of the Food Network series Food Network Star in a FoodSaver half-hour infomercial. He also hosted another Food Network series, "Donut Showdown", for the first season, being replaced by Daryn Jones for season 2.

Danny Boome can currently be seen as the host of Recipe Rehab, a weekly cooking series on ABC stations nationwide. Inspired by Everyday Health's popular YouTube show, Recipe Rehab is the first series to make the transition from a YouTube Original Channel to television. The 30-minute cooking show airs Saturdays.  Each episode features one family's decadent recipe and has two renowned chefs face off in an effort to recreate a lower-calorie, great tasting, healthier version of the dish. After weighing the new recipe's healthfulness, skill level and flavor, the family becomes the judge and declares which rehabbed dish wins!  Recipe Rehab is produced by Everyday Health Inc., the leading health and wellness media company.

Boome also has projects though his own production company, Crash Bang Boome Productions, up for consideration in the US, Canada, Australia and the UK.

Sources and external links
 Danny Boome website

Living people
English ice hockey players
English chefs
English television chefs
People from Peterborough
1976 births